Kposo language, or Ikposo, is the language of the Akposso people, mainly in the Plateau Region of Togo, west of Atakpamé, but also into eastern Ghana. It is considered one of the Ghana–Togo Mountain languages, but does not have the system of noun classes that is characteristic of other languages in the group.

References

Ghana–Togo Mountain languages
Languages of Togo
Languages of Ghana